Teresa Jane Davis (born 8 January 1968), also known by her stage name TJ Davis, is an English singer, songwriter and record producer. She started as a backing vocalist for Gary Numan, D:Ream and Blur, and quickly developed a career of her own. She is known among video game music aficionados for working with award-winning composer Richard Jacques on the soundtracks of Sonic R and Metropolis Street Racer. She was a member of ABBA tribute band Björn Again, performing as 'Frida Longstockin' from 1997 to 2004.

Her track, "Brilliant Feeling", billed as Full Monty Allstars featuring TJ Davis, peaked at #72 on the UK Singles Chart in July 1996. She also released the trance single "Wonderful Life" - a cover of the song by Colin Vearncombe - in December 2001. It was a collaboration with trance outfit Ian van Dahl, and reached #42 on the UK Singles Chart.
In 2002, Davis recorded the vocals on the Sash! song, "I Believe".

Discography

Studio albums 
 You and Me (1990)
 Living in the City (1992)
 Hopes and Dreams (1993)
 Get Prepared (2002)
 On the Fairway (2004)
 The Runaways (2007)
 The Top (2009)
 Bad Desire (2011)
 Move It! (2015)
 The Leftovers (2018)

References

External links 
 TJ Davis official website

1968 births
Living people
English women singers
English dance musicians
English record producers
English women in electronic music
British women record producers
Eurobeat musicians
Arista Records artists
Walt Disney Records artists
Universal Music Group artists
Musicians from Leeds